The Mid-Kent Open Championships was a men's and women's grass court tennis tournament founded in 1881, as a men only event called the Maidstone Lawn Tennis Tournament. The first staging of this event was at the Maidstone Athletic Ground, Sandling Place, Maidstone, Kent, England  before it was discontinued after only one season. In 1894 a new Maidstone Open  lawn tennis tournament was revived that featured the Mid-Kent Championships, this event ran until 1927.

History
In 1881 a Maidstone Lawn Tennis Tournament was first staged at the Maidstone, Athletic Ground, Maidstone, Kent, England. The first winner of the men's singles was Britain's Richard Mercer. In 1894 a Maidstone Open tournament was revived, that featured the Mid-Kent Championships that was sanctioned by the Lawn Tennis Association. The championship and ran until 1927.

Finals

Men's singles
(incomplete roll) included:
{|class="wikitable" style="font-size:95%;"
|-
! style="width:60px;"|Year
! style="width:240px;"|Winner
! style="width:200px;"|Runner-up
! style="width:160px;"|Score
|-
|colspan=6 align=center |Maidstone Tournament
|-
|1881 || Richard Mercer|| Mr. Stited||w.o.
|- 
|1883 ||  Randall Mercer|| Harold Sweetenham||6–3, 6–5, 6–4 
|- 
|colspan=6 align=center |Mid-Kent Championships
|-
|1897 || Hugh Marley || Charles Gladstone Allen||6-4, 6–2, 2–6, 1–6, 6-3
|-
|1900 || Roy Allen|| Reginald Arthur Gamble||6-4, 6–2, 6-1
|-
|1904|| Roy Allen|| George Lawrence Orme||6-2 6-4
|-
|1905|| Harry Alabaster Parker|| Charles Gladstone Allen||w.o.
|-
|1906|| Edward Lyell Bristow|| Ernest Taylor Annett||6-4, 6–0, 7-5
|-
|1907|| Alfred Ernest Beamish|| Roy Allen||6-3, 4–6, 8-6
|-
|1908||  Otto Froitzheim||  Robert Powell||4-6, 6–1, 6-4
|-
|1909|| Alfred Ernest Beamish|| Ernest Taylor Annett||6-2, 6-2
|-
|1910|| Alfred Ernest Beamish||  Allan Campbell Pearson||6-1, 6-1
|-
|1915/1918||colspan=3 align=center |Not held (due to world war one)
|-
|colspan=6 align=center |Mid-Kent Open Championships|-
|1919|| John Cecil Masterman|| G.N. Thompson||2-6, 6-0, 7-5
|-
|1920|| Lawrence Francis Davin|| John Cecil Masterman||6-3, 1-6, 6-2, 1-6, 6-4
|-
|-
|1925.|| Wilfrid Hay MacDowall Aitken||?||?
|-
|-
|1926.|| Wilfrid Hay MacDowall Aitken|| Guy Oscar Jameson||6-4, 6-1, 6-1. 
|-
|}

Womens SinglesIncomplete Roll''

References

Grass court tennis tournaments
Defunct tennis tournaments in the United Kingdom
Tennis tournaments in England